This is a list of presidents of the Judicial Yuan of the Republic of China. This position is also called the Chief justice since the 4th constitutional amendment in 1997, which mandated that the position holder shall also be a justice in the Constitutional Court.

List

Before 1947 Constitution
 Period: 1928 – 1948

Post-1947 Constitution
 Period: 1948 – 1999

Post-1947 Constitution (1997 Constitution amendment)
 Period: 1999 – 
Under the 4th constitutional amendment in 1997, the President of Judicial Yuan shall also be a justice. All presidents are unaffiliated to any party since then.

Timeline

References

Judicial Yuan
Judicial Yuan